Alcidion partitum is a species of longhorn beetles of the subfamily Lamiinae. It was described by White in 1855, and is known from Brazil and French Guiana.

References

Beetles described in 1855
Alcidion